English Boy may refer to:

English Boy (agency), modelling agency established by Alice Pollock and Sir Mark Palmer
"English Boy" (song), song by Pete Townshend from his 1993 album Psychoderelict
"English Boys" (song), song by the American band Blondie from their 1982 album The Hunter
English Boy Wonders, album by the English progressive rock band Big Big Train
"English Boys", a song by Luna Halo from their 2007 self-titled album